Darius Milhaud (4 September 1892 – 22 June 1974) was a French composer, conductor, and teacher. He was a member of Les Six—also known as The Group of Six—and one of the most prolific composers of the 20th century. His compositions are influenced by jazz and Brazilian music and make extensive use of polytonality. Milhaud is considered one of the key modernist composers. A renowned teacher, he taught many future jazz and classical composers, including Burt Bacharach, Dave Brubeck, Philip Glass, Steve Reich, Karlheinz Stockhausen and Iannis Xenakis among others.

Life and career
Milhaud was born in Marseille, the son of Sophie (Allatini) and Gad Gabriel Milhaud. His father was from an Ashkenazi Jewish family from Aix-en-Provence, and his mother from a Sephardi Jewish family from Italy. Milhaud began as a violinist, later turning to composition instead. Milhaud studied in Paris at the Paris Conservatory where he met his fellow group members Arthur Honegger and Germaine Tailleferre. He studied composition under Charles Widor and harmony and counterpoint with André Gedalge. He also studied privately with Vincent d'Indy. From 1917 to 1919, he served as secretary to Paul Claudel, the eminent poet and dramatist who was then the French ambassador to Brazil, and with whom Milhaud collaborated for many years, setting music for many of Claudel's poems and plays. While in Brazil, they collaborated on a ballet, L'Homme et son désir.

On his return to France, Milhaud composed works influenced by the Brazilian popular music he had heard, including compositions of Brazilian pianist and composer Ernesto Nazareth. Le bœuf sur le toit includes melodies by Nazareth and other popular Brazilian composers of the time, and evokes the sounds of Carnaval. Among the melodies is, in fact, a Carnaval tune by the name of "The Bull on the Roof" (in Portuguese, which he translated to French 'Le boeuf sur le toit', known in English as 'The Ox on the Roof'). He also produced Saudades do Brasil, a suite of twelve dances evoking twelve neighborhoods in Rio de Janeiro. Shortly after the original piano version appeared, he orchestrated the suite.

Contemporary European influences were also important. Milhaud dedicated his Fifth String Quartet (1920) to Arnold Schoenberg, and the following year conducted both the French and British premieres of Pierrot lunaire after multiple rehearsals. And on a trip to the United States in 1922, Milhaud heard "authentic" jazz for the first time, on the streets of Harlem, which left a great impact on his musical outlook. The following year, he completed his composition La création du monde (The Creation of the World), using ideas and idioms from jazz, cast as a ballet in six continuous dance scenes.

In 1925, Milhaud married his cousin, Madeleine (1902–2008), an actress and reciter. In 1930 she gave birth to a son, the painter and sculptor Daniel Milhaud, who was the couple's only child.

The invasion of France by Nazi Germany forced the Milhauds to leave France in 1940 and emigrate to the United States (his Jewish background made it impossible for Milhaud to return to his native country until after its liberation). He secured a teaching post at Mills College in Oakland, California, where he composed the opera Bolivar (1943) and collaborated with Henri Temianka and the Paganini Quartet. In an extraordinary concert there in 1949, the Budapest Quartet performed the composer's 14th String Quartet, followed by the Paganini Quartet's performance of his 15th; and then both ensembles played the two pieces together as an octet. The following year, these same pieces were performed at the Aspen Music Festival in Colorado, by the Paganini and Juilliard String Quartets.

Jazz pianist Dave Brubeck became one of Milhaud's most famous students when Brubeck furthered his music studies at Mills College in the late 1940s. In a February 2010 interview with JazzWax, Brubeck said he attended Mills, a women's college (men were allowed in graduate programs), specifically to study with Milhaud, saying, "Milhaud was an enormously gifted classical composer and teacher who loved jazz and incorporated it into his work. My older brother Howard was his assistant and had taken all of his classes." Brubeck named his first son Darius.

In 1947 Milhaud was among the founders of the Music Academy of the West summer conservatory, where popular songwriter Burt Bacharach was among his students. Milhaud told Bacharach, "Don't be afraid of writing something people can remember and whistle. Don't ever feel discomfited by a melody."

From 1947 to 1971, he taught alternate years at Mills and the Paris Conservatoire, until poor health, which caused him to use a wheelchair during his later years (beginning in the 1930s), compelled him to retire. He also taught on the faculty of the Aspen Music Festival and School. As well as Brubeck, his students included William Bolcom, Steve Reich, Katharine Mulky Warne, and Regina Hansen Willman. He died in Geneva at the age of 81, and he was buried in the Saint-Pierre Cemetery in Aix-en-Provence.

Works

Darius Milhaud was very prolific and composed for a wide range of genres. His opus list ended at 443.

Milhaud (like such contemporaries as Hindemith, Malipiero, Henry Cowell, Hovhaness, Martinů, and Villa-Lobos) was an extremely rapid creator, for whom the art of writing music seemed almost as natural as breathing. His most popular works include Le bœuf sur le toit (a ballet that lent its name to the legendary cabaret frequented by Milhaud and other members of Les Six), La création du monde (a ballet for small orchestra with solo saxophone, influenced by jazz), Scaramouche (a suite for two pianos, also for alto saxophone or clarinet and orchestra), and Saudades do Brasil (a dance suite). His autobiography is titled Notes sans musique (Notes Without Music), later revised as Ma vie heureuse (My Happy Life).

Notable students

Archival collections
 There is a Darius Milhaud Collection at Mills College in California.
Papers for the Darius Milhaud Society, formed by Milhaud's student Katharine Mulky Warne, are archived at Cleveland State University.
 There is another Darius Milhaud Collection at the New York Public Library for the Performing Arts in New York City.
 Seymore Fromer Collection at the Western Jewish History Center of the Judah L. Magnes Museum, in Berkeley, California, has librettos for Milhaud's opera, David, as well as a program for its American premiere, in Los Angeles at the Hollywood Bowl, and photocopies of newspaper coverage in the B'nai B'rith Messenger of Los Angeles of this event (1956).

Selected filmography

 The Beloved Vagabond (1915)
L'Inhumaine (1924)
 Land Without Bread (1933)
 Madame Bovary (1934)
 The Beloved Vagabond (1936)
 The Citadel of Silence (1937)
 Rasputin (1938)
 Mollenard (1938)
 Espoir: Sierra de Teruel (1945)
 The Private Affairs of Bel Ami (1947)
 Dreams That Money Can Buy (1947)
  (1969)

Legacy
Writing in his Guide to Twentieth Century Music, critic Mark Morris described Milhaud's work as "one of the unassessed quantities of 20th century music. For as one of its most prolific composers (around 450 works), the quality of his music is so patently uneven that the reputation for the banal and the shallow has masked what is or might be (given the paucity of performances) both inspired and fascinating." For a composer of acknowledged influence and significance, a number of his pieces lack contemporary professional recordings, such as the second Viola Concerto – a consequence perhaps of his prolific and uneven output.

Lycée intercommunal Darius-Milhaud near Paris is named after him.

Bibliography
 Deborah Mawer: Darius Milhaud. Modality and Structure in Music of the 1920s (Aldershot: Ashgate, 1997)
 Barbara L. Kelly: Tradition and Style in the Works of Darius Milhaud (1912–1939) (Aldershot: Ashgate, 2003)

References

Sources
 
  (French version published in 1953)

External links 

 Complete categorized list of Darius Milhaud's composed works, with opus numbers
 Darius Milhaud biography and works, Universal Edition
 Biography and audio from Service Sacrée, Milken Archive of American Jewish Music
 Darius Milhaud 1892–1974 by Ronald Crichton. The Musical Times, August 1974
 The Boeuf Chronicles – How the ox got on the roof: Darius Milhaud and the Brazilian sources of "Le Boeuf sur le Toit" by Daniella Thompson
 Darius Milhaud's maximum card from Israel 
 
 

 
1892 births
1974 deaths
20th-century classical composers
20th-century French composers
20th-century French male musicians
Academic staff of the Conservatoire de Paris
Aspen Music Festival and School faculty
Ballets Russes composers
Conservatoire de Paris alumni
French ballet composers
French classical composers
French emigrants to the United States
French male classical composers
20th-century French Sephardi Jews
Jazz-influenced classical composers
Jewish classical composers
Jews who emigrated to escape Nazism
Les Six
Members of the Académie des beaux-arts
Mills College faculty
Modernist composers
Music Academy of the West faculty
Music Academy of the West founders
Neoclassical composers
Neoromantic composers
Musicians from Aix-en-Provence
Musicians from Marseille
Pupils of César Franck
Pupils of Charles-Marie Widor
Pupils of Vincent d'Indy